Gersell Emanuel Carvajal Salas (born 26 September 2004) is a Costa Rican professional footballer who currently plays as a midfielder for Saprissa.

Career statistics

Club

Notes

References

2004 births
Living people
Costa Rican footballers
Association football midfielders
Deportivo Saprissa players
Liga FPD players